Alicante 8, also known as RSGC4, (Red Supergiant Cluster 4) is a young massive open cluster belonging to the Milky Way galaxy. It was discovered in 2010 in the 2MASS survey data. As of 2010, the only members of the cluster that are currently identified are 8–13 red supergiants—young massive stars undergoing helium burning in their cores. It is likely situated at the intersection of the northern end of the Long Bar of the Milky Way and the inner portion of the Scutum–Centaurus Arm—one of the two major spiral arms.

The age of Alicante 8 is estimated to be around 16–20 million years. The observed red supergiants are type II supernova progenitors. The cluster is heavily obscured and have not been detected in the visible light. It lies close to other groupings of red supergiants known as RSGC1, Stephenson 2, RSGC3, Alicante 7, and Alicante 10. The mass of the open cluster is estimated at 10–20 thousand solar masses, which makes it one of the most massive open clusters in the Galaxy.

References

Alicante 8
Scutum (constellation)
Scutum–Centaurus Arm